Calliodes is a genus of moths of the family Noctuidae.

Species
Calliodes appollina Guenée, 1852
Calliodes barnsi A.E. Prout, 1924
Calliodes pretiosissima Holland, 1892 (syn: Calliodes rivulifera Butler, 1893)

References

Natural History Museum Lepidoptera genus database

Catocalinae